Mount Schank is a  high dormant volcano in the southeast corner of South Australia, near Mount Gambier. It was sighted by James Grant on 3 December 1800 and named after Admiral John Schank, designer of Grant's ship, HMS Lady Nelson.

Mount Schank is part of the Newer Volcanics Province, which is the youngest volcanic field in Australia. Mount Schank erupted about 5,000 years ago, around the same time as Mount Gambier. It is a very basic ash cone and the base of the crater does not extend below the water table, so there is no crater lake as with those at Mount Gambier. There are two small subsidiary craters adjacent to the main cone and some lava flows resulting from the eruption.

The local Aboriginal Bunganditj people witnessed Mount Schank's eruptions over time. Their creation story about the local volcanic landscape was recorded by a local woman, Christina Smith, in 1880. It tells the tale of Craitbul, a giant, who was looking for a place to live with his wife and two sons. They camped at Mount Muirhead and Mount Schank, but were scared away from both these camps by a moaning bird spirit. They fled to Mount Gambier, leaving their camp ovens (the volcanoes) burning. After some time, water came and filled their ovens, putting them out and driving the spirit away. They continued to live in a cave on the side of Mount Gambier.

It is a fairly simple walk to traverse the rim, though the exposed situation can be treacherous in gusty weather.



Spelling
The usual spelling of the location was "Schanck" until around 1916, when the current spelling was adopted. This may have been prompted by the then vogue for Anglicising German place-names, but the ancient Schank family, of whom the Admiral was a member, had that spelling for much of its history.

Climate

See also
East Australia hotspot
Kanawinka Geopark

References

Volcanoes of South Australia
Volcanic cones
Dormant volcanoes
Limestone Coast